Renato Espinosa Torres (born 6 July 1998) is a Peruvian footballer who plays as a forward for Peruvian Primera División side Cantolao.

Club career

Ayacucho
In January 2017, Espinosa refused to sign a three-year professional contract with Sporting Cristal because the parties couldn't agree, and instead joined Ayacucho FC on a free agent, alongside three other former teammates from Sporting Cristal. Espinosa had been contacted by Francisco Melgar from Cristal's management, who Espinosa previously worked under at Cristal, and signed a deal for the whole 2017 season, after having played in three preseason friendly matches for Ayacucho.

However, Espinosa was never able to make his professional debut for the club.

Return to Sporting Cristal
In the summer 2017, only six months after his departure from Cristal, Espinosa officially returned to Sporting Cristal. He made his professional debut for Cristal in the following season, on 1 March 2018, against his former club Ayacucho FC in the Peruvian Primera División. Espinosa started on the bench, before he came on as a substitute for Josepmir Ballón in the 81st minute.

After only playing 14 minutes during the 2018 season in the Peruvian Primera División, Espinosa was loaned out to Universidad de San Martín for the 2019 season. Espinosa played 23 games and scored four goals.

Espinosa was loaned out again for the 2020 season, this time to UTC Cajamarca.

Alianza Universidad
On 3 December 2020 it was confirmed, that Espinosa had signed with Alianza Universidad for the 2021 season. He got his debut on 15 March 2021 against Cusco FC. Espinosa made a total of 23 appearances for the club, scoring five goal.

Deportivo Municipal
On 3 December 2021, Espinosa signed with Deportivo Municipal for the 2022 season.

Cantolao
On 8 December 2022, Academia Cantolao confirmed the signing of Espinosa.

References

External links
 

Living people
1998 births
Association football forwards
Peruvian footballers
Peruvian Primera División players
Club Deportivo Universidad de San Martín de Porres players
Ayacucho FC footballers
Sporting Cristal footballers
Club Alianza Lima footballers
Universidad Técnica de Cajamarca footballers
Alianza Universidad footballers
Deportivo Municipal footballers
Academia Deportiva Cantolao players
People from Lima